Andrzej Szarmach (born 3 October 1950) is a Polish former football player.

He played in the Polish national team during its "golden age" in the 1970s. With Grzegorz Lato at his right, Robert Gadocha at his left, and Kazimierz Deyna in support, Szarmach profited from the absence of Włodzimierz Lubański to lead the Polish attack, the best at 1974 World Cup, with sixteen goals. While Lato finished first in the Cup in goals with seven, Szarmach, with five goals, also marked the competition with his imprint. He confirmed his status two years later at the 1976 Olympics in Montreal, winning the silver medal and the title of best player of the tournament, with nine goals.

Jowled and moustached, the Polish attacker had a Gallic quality and thus easily fit in at AJ Auxerre. He won the favor of Guy Roux and of the Burgundian public, by scoring 94 goals between 1980 and 1985. After a brief period at Guingamp and a total of 32 goals in 61 games with the Polish national team, Szarmach began his career as a manager, in particular managing Clermont-Ferrand, then Châteauroux in the second division.

References

External links

1950 births
Living people
Polish footballers
Poland international footballers
Polish football managers
Polish expatriate football managers
Olympic footballers of Poland
Olympic silver medalists for Poland
Footballers at the 1976 Summer Olympics
Arka Gdynia players
Stal Mielec players
Górnik Zabrze players
AJ Auxerre players
Expatriate footballers in France
En Avant Guingamp players
Clermont Foot players
Ligue 1 players
Ligue 2 players
1974 FIFA World Cup players
1978 FIFA World Cup players
1982 FIFA World Cup players
Sportspeople from Gdańsk
Ekstraklasa players
Clermont Foot managers
LB Châteauroux managers
Angoulême Charente FC managers
Olympic medalists in football
Medalists at the 1976 Summer Olympics
Association football forwards